Stitch, also known as Experiment 626 (pronounced "six two six"), is a fictional character in Disney's Lilo & Stitch franchise. An illegally-made, genetically engineered, extraterrestrial life-form resembling a blue koala, he is one of the franchise's two title characters, alongside his human adopter and best friend Lilo Pelekai, and its most prominent protagonist. 

Stitch was created by Lilo & Stitch co-writer and co-director Chris Sanders, who also voices him in all Western-produced media that he appears in. Ben Diskin voices the character in the English versions of the Eastern-produced television spin-offs Stitch! and Stitch & Ai.

Development

Sanders originally created the character in 1985 for an unsuccessful children's book pitch and developed a treatment for an animated feature starring the character. The idea for the character was shelved until around 1996 when then-President of Walt Disney Feature Animation Thomas Schumacher approached Sanders and asked him if he wanted to pitch a story, giving Sanders the opportunity to use his character again. When Sanders said that the alien character was going to crash-land in a forest filled with other animals, Schumacher told Sanders that the animal world was already "overly alien" to humans, and suggested that the character should end up in the human world to provide better contrast and juxtaposition for the story.

In later development for the film's fictional story, the character was going to be the leader of an intergalactic gang of criminals, with Jumba being one of his previous good friends summoned by the Intergalactic Council to capture him. Test audience responses to early versions of the film resulted in the change of Stitch and Jumba's relationship to that of creation and creator, respectively.

The character was originally meant to be incapable of speaking intelligibly. However, when the Lilo & Stitch production team realized that the film's story "hinged" on the character being able to explain himself at the end of the film, Sanders provided vocals for Stitch during early animation, using a distinct, high-pitched, nasal voice that he previously used to annoy his co-workers. At the suggestion of co-writer and co-director Dean DeBlois—who Sanders personally attributes being co-creator of the Stitch character—out of shared concerns that Disney executives would demand Stitch to speak more than he needed to if they were to hire a professional voice actor, Sanders established himself as the official voice of the fictional character Stitch after the production team got used to his vocalizations. Sanders later revealed in a 2022 interview for Lilo & Stitchs 20th anniversary that Stitch's voice was consistently the lowest-rated aspect of the film, according to cards that were filled by audiences at test screenings.

Physical appearance
Stitch is a short, blue, koala-like alien. His large rabbit-like ears have asymmetrically-placed triangular notches on the outer rims of each ear; one near the tip of his right ear and another near the base of his left ear, although these notches are occasionally misplaced in some media, usually on their respective opposite ears. The back of the ear tips are colored indigo. He has a wide mouth, a round nose, black eyes, and a small, short, and stumpy tail. He has three tufts of fur on top of his head and another three on his chest. He has aqua countershading around his eyes and from his lower lip extending down to the bottom of his abdomen.

Stitch is characterized to have four arms (the lower pair of which are retractable), three retractable spines that run down his back, four sharp, retractable claws on each of his front and back paws (hands and feet), and two retractable antennae on his head. There are abstract indigo markings on his back and occiput that vaguely look similar to snow angels, with the back marking having two large "bulges" in the middle that allude to his four arms. He has a limited ability to change his physical appearance, as he can retract his lower pair of arms, his claws, his antennae, and the three back spines into his body. He is referred to as a "dog" by Lilo throughout much of the franchise, as he was taken to a pound and disguised himself as one in order to escape his captors by being adopted by Lilo. He was initially believed by Lilo to be a collie that had been hit by a car, while Nani thought he was a koala of a sort before they found out he was an alien genetic experiment.

Sanders's initial design concepts for Stitch differed heavily from the final version. Stitch was originally going to have green fur, which was changed in early development to the now-familiar blue. His black eyes were slightly smaller compared to his final version, his ears flared at their bases instead of close to their tips, and some early drawings placed his nose below the eye line instead of above. The early drawings also showed him with white or silver claws instead of dark blue claws, and he wore a yellow-orange spacesuit with burnt orange pants instead of the more uniform red-orange spacesuit that he wears in the original film's first act.

History

Lilo & Stitch (2002)

"Experiment 626" was created by "evil genius" Dr. Jumba Jookiba to cause and create chaos around the galaxy. They were both captured and put on trial by the United Galactic Federation, who sentenced 626 to life imprisonment on a desert asteroid. The Grand Councilwoman assigns Captain Gantu to escort him. 626 escapes, crash-landing a spaceship in Kauai, Hawaii. Disguising himself as a dog to hide from his captors, 626 is adopted by a little girl named Lilo, who names him "Stitch".

Lilo tries to teach Stitch to be good, using Elvis Presley as a model for his behavior. While these efforts prove to be fruitless at first, with Stitch unable to suppress his destructive programming, Lilo enjoys having Stitch as her "puppy", although he at first only wanted to use Lilo as a human shield from Jumba and Agent Pleakley. Jumba and Pleakley were sent to capture him. Stitch slowly develops a strong love for Lilo, to the point where he saves her from Gantu, who is the antagonist of the film. After his heroics, the Grand Councilwoman allows Stitch to serve his exile on Earth with Lilo as his warden, citing her dog adoption certificate (subsequently, Lilo seems to have become not only a best friend but also a sister figure to Stitch).

Lilo & Stitch 2: Stitch Has a Glitch (2005)

In this sequel film, set between the first film and Stitch! The Movie, Stitch is living well, reasonably well-behaved (although still hot-tempered and mischievous) with the exiled Jumba and Pleakley in Lilo's (and her older sister Nani's) house, until he begins malfunctioning. Jumba reveals that since Stitch was not fully charged after his creation, he will experience periodic glitches that revert to his original destructive programming, appearing to suffer from a "fit" or "seizure". Seeing this, Jumba creates a new charging chamber for Stitch. Not wanting to hurt anyone, Stitch attempts to leave Earth for a remote planet, while Lilo, Jumba, and the others desperately try to have him return so they can recharge him. Although they are too late when they place him in the recharging pod, Stitch seems to be revived by Lilo's love, which goes in accordance with her belief that love is more powerful than death.

Stitch! The Movie (2003)

After the events of Lilo & Stitch 2, Stitch discovers the remaining 625 genetic experiments locked in a crate, in the form of dehydrated pods. In order to rescue a kidnapped Jumba, a trade between Dr. Jacques von Hämsterviel and Jumba for the experiments are organized, but it instead results in the freedom of the experiments and the capture of Lilo and Stitch. Hämsterviel then tries to clone Stitch but he was rescued by Experiment 221 ("Sparky"). Stitch then rescued Lilo and landed Hämsterviel's spacecraft back in Kauai, where the Grand Councilwoman arrests him.

Lilo & Stitch: The Series (2003–2006)

After the events of Stitch! The Movie, Stitch and Lilo have to capture Jumba's other experiments and find them a home. Along the way, he meets his match: Experiment 627 who is tougher than him, but he eventually defeats with his greater intelligence. He also is affected by fifteen experiment powers: Amnesio wipes out his memory, being poked by Spike's spine makes him goofy, Babyfier turns him into a baby, Spooky turns into water and nearly drowns him, Lax makes him lazy, Dupe duplicates him into four (weakening his strength), Frenchfry serves him unhealthy junk food meals (along with Lilo and Pleakley) and fattens him up into a giant bowling ball, Yaarp sounds out his loud megaphone (deafening him), Snooty sucks out his mucus (effectively dehydrating him), Swirly hypnotizes him, Drowsy puts him to sleep, Houdini makes him invisible, Swapper switches him into Lilo's and then Pleakley's bodies, Bugby turns him into a bug, and Slushy freezes him. However, the powers wear off. He also meets Angel who is introduced as a love interest for Stitch, who becomes good out of love for Stitch.

Leroy & Stitch (2006)

After successfully capturing all the remaining experiments in the preceding series, the Grand Councilwoman offers Stitch the chance to become the captain of the Galactic Armada and their new flagship, The BRB (Big Red Battleship) 9000. However, that would require Stitch to be separated from Lilo. Not wanting to make Lilo sad, he chooses to return to Kaua'i, but Lilo tells him he should go. Before he leaves with Jumba and Pleakley, Lilo gives him a necklace with the god Ku Tiki on it to give him strength. When Gantu breaks out Dr. Hämsterviel in an action of frustration, Stitch is sent on his first mission to capture the evil rodent once more. But when he arrives at Galactic Defense Industries, Stitch faces off against Leroy, an enhanced clone of Stitch. Stitch fights well and is about to beat Leroy when Pleakley shows up unexpectedly, allowing Leroy to take advantage of Stitch's lapse in concentration and beat him. He is placed in a cage and sent with Jumba and Pleakley heading towards a black hole, and Leroy heads off towards Earth to capture all of the other experiments for Hämsterviel. Later, Stitch, Jumba, and Pleakley escape from the black hole and arrive on the planet Turo. There they rescue Lilo, 625 (now known as Reuben), and Gantu, and fly Pleakley's carpool van back to Earth to assist the other experiments in the defeat of an army of Leroys. With Leroy defeated, Stitch, Jumba, and Pleakley return to Earth with Lilo, realizing family is more important than spaceships, laboratories, and prestige.

Stitch! (anime)

In the anime series Stitch! (2008–12, 2015), Stitch seems to have reverted to his destructive nature and is first seen in the first episode being chased in a spaceship by Jumba and the authorities, ending up on an island in the Okinawa Prefecture in Japan. On the island, Stitch gained a new human friend named Yuna Kamihara. The original version (aired in Japan) initially left out what happened between Lilo and Stitch that caused them to be separated, although the heavily edited international version of the anime, which includes the English dub, had Jumba imply that Stitch ran away out of jealousy of Lilo having a boyfriend. Lilo herself did not appear in any way in the anime until episode 23 of ~Best Friends Forever~ (Season 3), where she, now a fully-grown woman, visits Okinawa's New Town with her daughter, Ani (who looks incredibly like her when she was a child and whom Stitch thought was Lilo in the beginning). Lilo and Stitch were able to reconcile upon reuniting, with Lilo explaining what happened on the day Stitch left her. They both have a happy reunion, she hugs him, promises to visit him again, and asks Stitch to take good care of his new family. She then gives Stitch his tiki necklace back before leaving to return to Hawaii.

Stitch & Ai

In the Chinese animated series Stitch & Ai (2017), Stitch was kidnapped from Lilo by an alien faction called the Jaboodies, who hold him captive in their battle cruiser spaceship as they desire to forcibly use him to with a space war against a rival faction called the Woolagongs, who also want to use Stitch to win the space war. When the Woolagongs attack the ship wanting Stitch for themselves, he uses the opportunity to escape back to Earth, jumping from the Jaboodie battle cruiser and re-entering Earth's atmosphere. He is protected during re-entry by—as explained in the cold open of the sixth episode "The Lock"—"special qi energy" that also caused him to lose part of his memories, including his memory of Lilo (who only appears in recreated flashbacks in this series). He ends up in the Huangshan mountains and meets a young Chinese girl who lives there named Wang Ai Ling, who (similarly to Lilo) takes him into her family as her new pet "dog". He helps Ai in preventing her aunt Daiyu from forcibly moving her from the mountains to the city, while she (and later Jumba and Pleakley) help protect him from being taken by either the Jaboodies or the Woolagongs, as well as look for a shrine that's he seen in a vision he had.

Personality

Throughout the course of the entire Lilo & Stitch franchise, Stitch is depicted as a character that is unlikeable to many people due to his destructive and temperamental behavior. The one and primary exception is Lilo, who only falls out with him in the rarest occasions, most notably in Lilo & Stitch 2, where she was unaware that the glitches he was possessed by throughout most of the film were reverting him back to his original destructive behavior.

When Stitch is in his "evil" form, he is undeniably worrying as his somewhat botched physique underlines his at the time twisted behavior; in "good" form, however (the form that the audience most often sees), Stitch's display of emotion at being rejected due to his behavior and looks while trying to act good for Lilo is meant to make him seem more adorable to the audience. In any case, people who are averse to Stitch in any way, shape, or form, describe him as "ugly and deformed", while people with affection for him describe him as "cute and fluffy". This reflects the basic idea behind Stitch and also his cousins: in no manner do they correspond to many established criteria of good physical appearance.

Despite his surface destructiveness, which does not go away even after he has become "good", Stitch is a complex character; according to his creator Jumba, Stitch as a destructive machine was not given a higher purpose in life. Since Stitch is trapped on an island where there are relatively few things to destroy, he has many occasions to reflect on other occupations than evil. It is implied that Stitch destroys only because that is what he is programmed to do (In the original Lilo & Stitch film, Jumba claimed that Stitch's "destructive programming" was taking effect and that he would be irresistibly drawn to large cities to "back up sewers, reverse street signs, and steal everyone's left shoe." This is shown in the Lilo & Stitch: The Series episode "Kixx", where Lilo and Stitch are watching Keoni skateboard, then Stitch looks in Keoni's rucksack and eats Keoni's shoe, Keoni replies by saying "Hey, my shoes!" in which Lilo says, "He only eats the left ones!"); but since he has a personality of his own (a fact that only Lilo truly understands), he also has the choice, even will, not to do so.

Despite having superhuman strength and a high level of computer intelligence, Stitch is emotionally fragile and has a childlike personality beneath his "monster" appearance. Lilo believes that one reason why he originally pursued his destructiveness was for similar reasons to her own naughtiness: that it was because he was emotionally scarred (for having been made as a monster by Jumba) but received little understanding or sympathy from others. Stitch becomes much more well-meaning after his betterment but is frequently unable to control all of his impulses to antisocial actions. Fortunately for him, there are those who are always there to support him—most notably Lilo and, later, Angel and Reuben—to whom he returns the favor willingly.

Fictional character details
Stitch is created by Dr. Jumba Jookiba to cause chaos across the galaxy. Stitch is marked by his mischievous behavior, which endeared him to Lilo, who adopts him as her "dog". Through Lilo's beliefs in the Hawaiian concept of ohana, meaning 'family', Stitch evolves from an uncaring, destructive creature to a loving, more self-conscious being who enjoys the company of his adoptive family on Earth. He becomes a firm believer of the ohana concept, and with the help of Lilo applies it to reform Jumba's 625 prior experiments, nearly all of whom Stitch treats as his "cousins".

While explaining his creation to the Galactic Council early on in Lilo & Stitch, Dr. Jumba gives the following rundown of Stitch's powers: "He is bulletproof, fireproof, and can think faster than a super computer. He can see in the dark and can move objects at least 3,000 times his size. His only instinct — to destroy everything he touches!"
 While Stitch is never seen shot by a bullet, he can endure being shot by plasma projectiles. He can even catch them in his hands before throwing it back to the shooter, as shown in the original film, Stitch! The Movie, Leroy & Stitch, and Stitch & Ai. Stitch was shown to be hit by one in the episode "Finder" when Hämsterviel, armed with a self-made plasma cannon, shot him with it, which only made Stitch unconscious (it is assumed that plasma projectiles are deadly to humans as Lilo occasionally is almost shot by one in the franchise). As he dodges all other plasma projectiles, Jumba did claim that Stitch being hit by one would stun him long enough to be defeated by a foe. He did survive the crash of his spaceship with only a scratch, is only briefly stunned by a fall of several thousand feet, and has to be run over by three tractor-trailers in succession to be knocked out.
 As for fireproof, in the original film he drives a tanker truck full of gasoline into a volcano, which in the ensuing explosion he is propelled into the air, a move he uses to strike at Gantu's spaceship to thwart his capture of Lilo.
 Thinking faster than a supercomputer is harder to quantify, but he does escape from captivity fairly ingeniously, builds a model of San Francisco after only glancing at Earth vs. the Spider; grabs a crossword puzzle from the table and finishes it in about eight seconds; is often seen solving complex mathematical equations; builds a bomb out of a plasma bolt, Lilo's doll Scrump, and a roller skate; builds a mechanical bull out of a toaster, a vacuum cleaner, and a lamp; a DNA double helix from only coconuts, hollow sticks and a turntable; is able to understand he can use a human as a shield from Jumba, by Pleakley's presence; and generally picks up quickly on what is happening around him. He is also fluent in playing string instruments like the guitar or the ukulele, and is capable of driving any sort of vehicle, which can be as simple as riding a tricycle—which his strength allows him to speed one up to beyond the normal capabilities of a tricycle propelled by a human—or as complex as piloting intergalactic spaceships.
 His eyes can pick up various forms of light and he can filter out one or the other if necessary. Stitch can see in normal vision (during this mode, his eyes appear black in color), night vision (which is green), infrared (red) and X-ray (bright green). Furthermore, he also can magnify his vision. However, his high sensitivity to light also causes flash lights to be very painful to him. In the original film, Stitch earns respect for performing Elvis Presley, but he then attacks his fans after the flashes from their cameras bother him.
 His ability to lift objects 3,000 times his own size and weight is seen several times throughout the franchise, including incidents where he picks up a descending blast door, hits Dr. Jumba with a thrown Volkswagen Beetle (shouting gleefully, "Blue punch buggy! No punch back!") and stops a tanker truck. This ability is sometimes joked about in the later series; for example, in Stitch! The Movie, Hämsterviel, while physically restraining Stitch for a cloning experiment, counters Stitch's strength with restraint devices, that are equal in strength themselves, as Hämsterviel loudly declares, to 3,001 times Stitch's own weight. Another such example of the limitation of such strength was in the Lilo & Stitch: The Series "Swirly", where Stitch showed his strength off on a television show by holding up two bulldozers on a platform only to have it come crashing down on him when Gantu throws a backstage pass onto to one of the bulldozers, stating he can hold up to three thousand times his weight, but not an ounce more.

Like his "cousins", the pads on Stitch's hands and feet can secrete a sticky substance allowing him to adhere to almost any surface and scale buildings and walls; and his skeletal system is very flexible, allowing him to become a rolling ball and also to squeeze through tight spaces. Stitch's legs are small, but powerful enough to enable him to jump several feet into the air and he's shown to be very agile.

Stitch also can act as an audio amplifier, radio, and/or microphone, illustrated in the original film when he uses a finger as the needle on a record player, and the music comes out of his open mouth, then again in The Series episode "The Asteroid" when he uses his ears to overhear from a distance Cobra Bubbles talking to a scientist about the threat of an asteroid close to impacting the Earth, and the sound of the discussion comes out of Stitch's mouth to allow Lilo to listen to it. He has an acute sense of smell and hearing (though the latter can lead to temporary deafness when exposed to sonic blasts) and is also dexterously skilled in hand-to-hand combat, using all four arms or just two.

Stitch can also be noted for his immortality. Although the Lilo & Stitch franchise is set in the current year, he is shown to have no signs of aging as seen in the episode "Skip" for 10–20 years, much to his chagrin (although suggested by an aged Lilo to grow a goatee to make him look older), as well as in the Stitch! anime series which is set years after Leroy & Stitch (as seen by Lilo's reappearance as an adult in this show).

Stitch is proven to be ticklish in Lilo & Stitch: The Series. In "Shortstuff", Stitch is tickled by a ray used to make him bigger.

Stitch's greatest weakness is his inability to float or swim due to his dense molecular structure, which causes him to sink in water. Stitch originally also had an instinctive aquaphobia, but was able to overcome it because of Lilo: in The Series episode "Spooky", Experiment 300 (the titular "Spooky")—which has the ability to transform into a person's worst fear—was activated; for Stitch, he transformed into water, but Lilo showed Stitch her coping mechanism for when she gets scared (for her it's singing the chorus of "Aloha ʻOe"), which is how Stitch was able to save her later in the episode. Also, as mentioned earlier, since Stitch's molecules were not fully charged upon creation as shown in Lilo & Stitch 2: Stitch Has a Glitch, if his initial charging was not finished he would later suffer seizure-like glitches that would revert him to his original destructive programming before dying. This issue was resolved by the film's end, and he no longer suffers these glitches.

Stitch also has different abilities in the Asian-produced spin-off shows Stitch! and Stitch & Ai that were not previously revealed in the 2002 to 2006 Western-produced continuity. In Stitch! ~Best Friends Forever~ (the anime's third season), he has a hidden power cell within him that can supercharge his powers to greater levels. In Stitch & Ai, he has metamorphosis abilities that change his appearance in some form and give him additional abilities, including being able to sprout quills around his neck, extend a patagium to glide through the air like a flying squirrel, and most significantly, when his destructive programming is fully triggered, grow into a giant monster with four laser-firing tentacles that sprout forward from his back, further enhancing his destructive capabilities. (This particular ability contradicts a deleted version of the opening scene of the original Lilo & Stitch film, which shows the then-Experiment 626 having already caused destruction in an alien city in his smaller, familiar true form. The ability also contradicts the Lilo & Stitch: The Series episode "Shortstuff", which showed that Stitch is clumsier as a giant, and in which Jumba stated to the giant Stitch that he was designed to function most efficiently at his exact original size.)

In other media

Kingdom Hearts series
Stitch appears as a summon in the video game, Kingdom Hearts II, making a minor influence at Hollow Bastion (in part being responsible for sending Sora and the others into Space Paranoids). He also appears along with his homeworld, Deep Space, as a fighting partner to Ven and Aqua in the prequel Kingdom Hearts Birth by Sleep. The world is set in space and revolves around on his escape from Gantu's custody, before arriving in Radiant Garden. Stitch appears in Kingdom Hearts III as a summon much like in Kingdom Hearts II.

Disney Infinity
Stitch was included in the Toy Box Starter Pack (alongside Braves Merida) for Disney Infinity: 2.0 Edition.

The Kingdom Keepers
Playing only a small role in the beginning of Disney in Shadow, Stitch chased Finn accompanied by a crew of pirates. Thought to have come out of Stitch's Great Escape!, he apprehends Finn and Maybeck. In Power Play, the keepers suspect that Stitch might have been put under a spell and may not have actually been an Overtaker (one of the Disney characters and Walt Disney World park attractions attempting to take over the park). In Shell Game, this is seen to likely have been true as Stitch saves Finn at Typhoon Lagoon from CPR Dummies.

References in other Disney media
Stitch makes a cameo amongst the crowd of Disney characters coming in to watch the film The Lion King 1½, appearing silhouetted in his full form.

There is a Stitch doll off to the left corner on the lowest shelf in young Jim Hawkins' room in Disney's other 2002 intergalactic film Treasure Planet.

Stitch appears riding in his spaceship passing by Aladdin and the Magic Carpet briefly three times in the Virtual Magic Carpet Ride game included on Disc 2 of the 2004 Aladdin Platinum Edition DVD.

In Brother Bear, Stitch makes an appearance in the outtakes.

Stitch is referenced in the background twice in the 2014 film, Big Hero 6. While Hiro Hamada is distracting Aunt Cass as she's making hot wings, there is a photo of Mochi the cat on the wall behind him on the stairs. In the photo, viewers can see that Mochi is dressed up as Stitch, in his red-orange alien spacesuit. Later, when in Fred's mansion bedroom, a Stitch pillow can be seen on Fred's bed along with a Splodyhead (Experiment 619) pillow.

Stitch appears in the 2011 motion-controlled video game Kinect: Disneyland Adventures as a meet-and-greet character who appears in the park's Tomorrowland area. He is also featured in the Nintendo 3DS life simulation games Disney Magical World and Disney Magical World 2 as an interactive character that the player can speak to and assist in quests. He also appears in Disney Dreamlight Valley (to which he was added in a December 2022 update) as a villager living in the titular valley.

Reception and legacy

After the success of the original Lilo & Stitch film, Stitch quickly became one of Disney's most popular characters, especially in terms of merchandising. The Verges Kaitlyn Tiffany wrote in a May 2017 article arguing that the character remains popular fifteen years after Lilo & Stitchs release due to his flawed nature, which made him "endlessly relatable", and would outlast more recent characters who are similar in certain aspects to him such as the Minions of Universal Studios's Despicable Me franchise and Baby Groot of Marvel Studios's Guardians of the Galaxy Vol. 2 as a result.

Not all reception towards the character has been positive; Scott Mendelson of Forbes wrote an article released on the same day that a live-action Lilo & Stitch remake was reported to be in development stating that he preferred the human leads Lilo and Nani over Stitch, considering the alien to be a detriment to the film. Mendelson stated that he hated the alien character because "he spent 99% of the movie making [Lilo and Nani's] lives even harder to the point of possible ruin and death" and that watching the character's mischief "was an exercise in frustration and concern for the sympathetic human leads."

References

Extraterrestrial superheroes
Adoptee characters in films
Fictional characters from Hawaii
Animated characters in film
Film characters introduced in 2002
Animated characters introduced in 2002
Fictional characters with superhuman strength
Fictional characters with superhuman senses
Fictional genetically engineered characters
Fictional fugitives
Fictional illeists
Fictional mammals
Fictional monsters
Male characters in animation
Male characters in anime and manga
Science fiction film characters
Science fiction television characters
Walt Disney Animation Studios characters